On June 8 and June 9, 2010, youth riots broke out in Rinkeby, a suburb dominated by Muslim immigrant residents, in northern Stockholm, Sweden. Up to 100 Muslim youths threw bricks, set fires and attacked the local police station in Rinkeby.

It was among the earliest urban riots by Muslim immigrant youth in Sweden.

Rioting
The riot broke out late on the evening of 8 June, when a group of young adults were refused admittance to a junior high school dance; angered, they responded by throwing rocks through the windows of the school.  From there, the rioting spread.  Rioting continued for two nights.  Police estimate that about 100 young men participated in the rioting, throwing bricks, setting fires and attacking the police station.

Rioters threw rocks at police, attacked a police station and burned down a school, throwing rocks at responding fire engines and preventing fire fighters from reaching the school in time to save the building.

Analysis

Social activist George Lakey describes the 2010 Rinkeby riots as among the earliest riots by migrant youth in Sweden.

Founder of iona Institute - the Catholic Pressure Group, commentator David Quinn linked the riots to immigration of Muslims blaming "the mainstream political parties, aided for the most part by the mainstream media," for abetting the rise of right wing political movement by "refus(ing) to permit an open and honest debate about" the causes of this and other riots by immigrant youth, and also by ignoring the "anti-Semitism, sex abuse, voter fraud," in immigrant communities.

Sociologist Peggy Levitt attributes the riots to anger over "long-term youth unemployment and poverty."

Background

Rinkeby is noted for its high concentration of immigrants and people with immigrant ancestry. 89.1% of the population of Rinkeby had a first- or second-generation immigrant background as of 31 December 2007.

See also

2017 Rinkeby riots
2013 Stockholm riots
2016 Sweden riots
2008 Malmö mosque riots
2009 Malmö anti-Israel riots
2013 Trappes riots
2011 English riots
2009 French riots
2007 Villiers-le-Bel riots
2006 Brussels riots
2005 French riots

References

2010 fires in Europe
2010 in Sweden
2010 riots
2010s in Stockholm
Fires in Sweden
Race riots in Sweden
Riots and civil disorder in Sweden
Protests in Sweden
Protests in the European Union
June 2010 events in Europe
Metropolitan Stockholm